Gadiculus thori is a species of cod found in the northeastern Atlantic Ocean.

Gadiculus thori was until recently considered a subspecies of the more widely distributed silvery pout, Gadiculus argenteus.  Currently, the distribution of G. argenteus is thought to be more southerly, in the western Mediterranean and the adjacent Atlantic, while G. thori is found from the Bay of Biscay north up to the North Cape.

References

Gadidae
Taxa named by Johannes Schmidt (biologist)
Fish described in 1913